The Peter and Henriette Wyeth Hurd House, in San Patricio, New Mexico, was listed on the National Register of Historic Places in 2014.

The property is the house and studios of artists Peter Hurd (1904-1984) and Henriette Wyeth Hurd (1907-1997), who lived and painted here from the 1930s until their deaths.  It has a placita, or open courtyard, in the style of historic ranchos in New Mexico.

It is located at 129 La Mancha Lane in San Patricio.

References

External links

		
National Register of Historic Places in Lincoln County, New Mexico
Buildings and structures in Lincoln County, New Mexico